Struggle Well marks the first album from Mouth of the South. Facedown Records released the project on August 5, 2014. Mouth of the South worked with Matt McClellan on the production of this album.

Reception

Specifying in a three and a half star review by HM Magazine, Collin Simula responds, "It makes for a very intricate and exhausting listen, but when the ride is worth it, no one ever regrets going on it." Aaron Lambert, indicating in a three and a half star review from Jesus Freak Hideout, realizing, "In spite of the growth displayed on Struggle Well, Mouth of the South are still playing it safe." Signaling in a three out of ten review from Exclaim!, Bradley Zorgdrager retorts, "Struggle Well could be cleverly marketed as 'heavier than Hell,' but the deadweight's got Mouth of the South stuck in the fire of their namesake, where they're burning down." Brody B., writes in a four star review from Indie Vision Music, replying, "Mouth of the South create an impressive debut record on Facedown. While it does not break the mold of what to expect from the modern metalcore genre, 'Struggle Well' takes a few steps in the right direction providing interesting spoken word sections, creative songwriting, and a gritty vibe."

Track listing

Charts

References

2014 albums
Facedown Records albums